Lipac is a village in the municipality of Doboj, Bosnia and Herzegovina. It is inhabited by ethnic Serbs.

Notable people
Aleksandar Đurić (born 1970), Bosnian-born Singaporean footballer.

References

Villages in Republika Srpska
Populated places in Doboj